Zelda May Rubinstein (May 28, 1933 – January 27, 2010) was an American actress and human rights activist, known as eccentric medium Tangina Barrons in the Poltergeist film series. Playing "Ginny", she was a regular on David E. Kelley's Emmy Award-winning television series Picket Fences for two seasons. She also made guest appearances in the TV show Poltergeist: The Legacy (1996), as seer Christina, and was the voice of Skittles candies in their long-running "Taste the Rainbow" ad campaign. Rubinstein was also known for her outspoken activism for little people and her early participation in the fight against HIV/AIDS.

Early life
Rubinstein was born in Pittsburgh, Pennsylvania, on May 28, 1933, to Jewish immigrant parents from Poland, Dolores and George Rubinstein.  She was the youngest of three children and the only short-statured person in her family (she has been incorrectly referred to as a dwarf).  Rubinstein did not become comfortable with her short stature until she was an adult.  In a 1992 interview with the Chicago Sun-Times, Rubinstein told the newspaper that she "had a rough childhood, [but] I became very verbally facile... I learned to meet everyone head-on."

Commenting in 2002 on the challenges of being a very short-statured person, Rubinstein said, "Midgets are societally handicapped. They have about two minutes to present themselves as equals—and if they don’t take advantage of that chance, then people fall back on the common assumption that 'less' is less."

Rubinstein won a scholarship to the University of Pittsburgh, where she earned her bachelor's degree in bacteriology and became a sister of the national sorority Phi Sigma Sigma. She moved to Berkeley, California, at the age of 25, studied at the University of California, Berkeley, and worked as a medical lab technician at blood banks.

Acting career

In 1978, Zelda decided to pursue an acting career. She studied acting at the University of California. Poltergeist was her first major film role.

Film critic Pauline Kael, who essentially dismissed Poltergeist as an "entertaining hash", held special praise for Rubinstein's portrayal of the psychic Tangina, saying she "gives the movie new life and makes a large chunk of it work."

She remained active in film and television thereafter, frequently portraying various psychic characters, such as her appearance on Jennifer Slept Here. She also narrated the horror television series Scariest Places on Earth, which aired in the U.S. on ABC Family and in Canada on YTV.

Rubinstein's other minor/major film roles included Sixteen Candles, Under the Rainbow, Cages, Teen Witch, The Wildcard, Southland Tales and National Lampoon's Last Resort. She also contributed voice-over work for TV including Hey Arnold!, and The Flintstones. She made numerous guest appearances on network TV shows, including Caroline in the City, Martin, Mr. Belvedere, and had a starring role as Ginny Weedon in the TV series Picket Fences. Her character there was killed off in typical off-beat fashion, by falling into a freezer early in the third season. She also appeared in an episode of Tales From The Crypt in which she played the mother of a girl who has been dead for 40 years.

She also starred in two different roles on Santa Barbara in 1984 and in 1990.

Beginning in 1999, she did voiceovers in television starting with the Fox Family reality TV show Scariest Places on Earth, commercials promoting movies such as Lady in the Water, and products including Skittles candy. Her last film role came in 2007 when she made a cameo appearance in the horror film Behind the Mask: The Rise of Leslie Vernon. She also appeared in a cameo as herself at the Revenge of the Mummy ride in Universal Studios Florida on the screens which shows various actors from the films warning the people to leave, telling them about the curse of Imhotep.

Human rights and activism
Rubinstein became active in the fight against HIV/AIDS in 1984. She appeared in a series of advertisements, directed towards gay men specifically, promoting safer sex and AIDS awareness. Rubinstein did so at risk to her own career, especially so shortly after her rise to fame, and admitted later that she did "pay a price, career-wise." "I lost a friend to AIDS, one of the first public figures that died of AIDS," the actress said in an interview with The Advocate. "I knew it was not the kind of disease that would stay in anybody's backyard. It would climb the fences, get over the fences into all of our homes. It was not limited to one group of people." She attended the first AIDS Project Los Angeles AIDS Walk.

Death
Rubinstein died in Los Angeles, California, on January 27, 2010. She was 76. Eric Stevens, Rubinstein's agent for four years, said the actress had never recovered from a mild heart attack that she had had several months earlier, which he said had left her a patient at Barlow Respiratory Hospital in Los Angeles. "She had several pre-existing conditions that she had been dealing with for years, and unfortunately they began to overtake her," Stevens said. Stevens also said that per Rubinstein's request, no funeral would be held.

Filmography

Films

References

External links

 
 

1933 births
2010 deaths
Actresses from Pittsburgh
Actors with dwarfism
American film actresses
American television actresses
American voice actresses
University of Pittsburgh alumni
University of California, Berkeley alumni
Actresses from Berkeley, California
Actresses from Los Angeles
Jewish American actresses
American people of Polish-Jewish descent
Deaths from kidney failure
Deaths from lung disease
20th-century American actresses
21st-century American actresses
HIV/AIDS activists
Jewish American activists
Jewish human rights activists
21st-century American Jews